Elisabeth von Ungnad (1614–1683), was a German court official.

She was the lady-in-waiting to Juliana of Hesse-Darmstadt. She married Freiherr Johann von Marenholtz, and the two spouses exerted great influence in Ostfriesland as the favorites of Juliane during her regency.

References 

1614 births
1683 deaths
German ladies-in-waiting